The Yonder Mountain String Band is an American progressive bluegrass group from Nederland, Colorado. Composed of Dave Johnston, Ben Kaufmann, Adam Aijala, and Nick Piccininni, the band has released five studio albums and several live recordings to date.

History 

Having met in Urbana, Illinois, banjo player Dave Johnston requested Jeff Austin to join and sing in his band The Bluegrassholes. Austin, who played no instrument, revealed to Johnston that he owned a mandolin, who then told him to come to the performance and "play anything, just play fast and loud."

After the collapse of The Bluegrassholes, Johnston moved to Boulder, Colorado, in order to further his bluegrass musical skills. Similarly, Austin moved to Colorado, but instead took up residence in the mountain town of Nederland, Colorado . Johnston soon joined him there. It was during this time in Nederland that Johnston and Austin met bassist Ben Kaufmann and guitarist Adam Aijala at a local club named the Verve. In December 1998, the four musicians formed Yonder Mountain String Band which was to open for a band at the Fox Theatre in Boulder. The band developed both a bluegrass and jam band fan base, and can often be found on tour. Their debut album Elevation was released on Frog Pad Records, an independent record label run by the band, in the fall of 1999.

From 1999 to 2001 they performed as one of the many attractions at NedFest, a music festival held in the band's hometown.  By 2000, the group was also playing larger venues, such as The Fillmore in San Francisco, California. 
In 2005, their recording of "Think for Yourself" was included on the album This Bird Has Flown – A 40th Anniversary Tribute to the Beatles' Rubber Soul.

In 2008, the band performed at the 2008 Democratic National Convention in Denver.

In 2010, it was revealed that Yonder Mountain would host a music festival at Mulberry Mountain in Ozark, Arkansas called Yonder Mountain's Harvest Festival. This is the same site where the larger Wakarusa festival is held and where the previous Mulberry Mountain Harvest Fest was held. In 2011, the festival's headliners included Bela Fleck and the Flecktones, the Simcha Aknin Band, Railroad Earth and the Emmitt-Nershi Band.

In April 2014, Austin left the band due to "creative differences and conflicting career goals". After touring with the band since Austin's departure, fiddle player Allie Kral and mandolin player Jake Jolliff became official members of Yonder Mountain String Band in May 2015. In 2020, multi-instrumentalist/mandolinist Nick Piccininni joined after playing with the madgrass group Floodwood.

Their 2022 album Get Yourself Outside is a nominee for the 2023 Grammy for Best Bluegrass Album.

Members

Ben Kaufmann - bass, vocals 
Dave Johnston  - banjo, vocals  
Adam Aijala - guitar, vocals 
Nick Piccininni - Everything, vocals

Former members
Jeff Austin - mandolin, vocals (1998-2014) – He picked up the mandolin only a few years before forming YMSB.  He would often break into a freeform scat during a song. Austin died on June 24, 2019, at the age of 45.
Jacob Jolliff - mandolin (2015-2020)
Allie Kral - fiddle, vocals (2015-2022)

Discography

Music videos
"Classic Situation"
"Insult and an Elbow"
"Bad Taste"
"Ailson"

Frog Pad Records
Frog Pad Records is an independent record label run by the Yonder Mountain String Band. Used as a platform to launch their CDs, the label has since released numerous albums, as well as an anthology and some duet work by Jeff Austin and Chris Castino.

References

External links
Official site
 

American bluegrass music groups
Jam bands
Jammy Award winners
Country music groups from Colorado
1998 establishments in Colorado
Musical groups established in 1998